This is a list of airlines currently operating in Slovenia.

Charter airlines

Cargo airlines

See also
 List of airlines
 List of defunct airlines of Slovenia
 List of defunct airlines of Europe
 List of airlines of Yugoslavia

Slovenia
Airlines
Airlines
Slovenia